In the 18th century and most of the 19th, a sloop-of-war in the Royal Navy was a warship with a single gun deck that carried up to eighteen guns. The rating system covered all vessels with 20 guns and above; thus, the term sloop-of-war encompassed all the unrated combat vessels, including the very small gun-brigs and cutters. In technical terms, even the more specialised bomb vessels and fireships were classed as sloops-of-war, and in practice these were employed in the sloop role when not carrying out their specialised functions.

They performed similar duties to the American destroyer escort class ships, and also performed similar duties to the smaller corvettes of the Royal Navy.

Rigging
A sloop-of-war was quite different from a civilian or mercantile sloop, which was a general term for a single-masted vessel rigged in a way that would today be called a gaff cutter (but usually without the square topsails then carried by cutter-rigged vessels), though some sloops of that type did serve in the 18th century British Royal Navy, particularly on the Great Lakes of North America.

In the first half of the 18th century, most naval sloops were two-masted vessels, usually carrying a ketch or a snow rig. A ketch had main and mizzen masts but no foremast. A snow had a foremast and a main mast immediately abaft which a small subsidiary mast was fastened on which the spanker was set.

Ship sloop 
The first three-masted, i.e., "ship rigged", sloops appeared during the 1740s, and from the mid-1750s most new sloops were built with a three-masted (ship) rig. The third mast afforded the sloop greater mobility and the ability to back sail.

Brig sloop

In the 1770s, the two-masted sloop re-appeared in a new guise as the brig sloop, the successor to the former snow sloops. Brig sloops had two masts, while ship sloops continued to have three (since a brig is a two-masted, square-rigged vessel, and a ship is a square-rigger with three or more masts, though never more than three in that period).

The brig rig was economical of manpower – important given Britain's chronic shortfall in trained seamen relative to the demands of the wartime fleet. When armed with carronades (32-pounders in the Cruizer class, 18-pounders in the Cherokee class), they had the highest ratio of firepower to tonnage of any ships in the Royal Navy, albeit within the short range of the carronade. The carronades also used much less manpower than the long guns normally used to arm frigates. Consequently, the Cruizer class were often used as cheaper and more economical substitutes for frigates, in situations where the frigates' high cruising endurance was not essential. A carronade-armed brig, however, would be at the mercy of a frigate armed with long guns, so long as the frigate maneuvered to exploit its superiority of range. The other limitation of brig sloops as opposed to post ships and frigates was their relatively restricted stowage for water and provisions, which made them less suitable for long-range cruising. However, their shallower draught made them excellent raiders against coastal shipping and shore installations.

Bermuda sloop

The Royal Navy also made extensive use of the Bermuda sloop, both as a cruiser against French privateers, slavers, and smugglers, and also as its standard advice vessels, carrying communications, vital persons and materials, and performing reconnaissance duties for the fleets.

Bermuda sloops were found with gaff rig, mixtures of gaff and square rig, or a Bermuda rig. They were built with up to three masts. The single masted ships had huge sails and harnessed tremendous wind energy, which made them demanding to sail and required large, experienced crews. The Royal Navy favoured multi-masted versions, as it was perennially short of sailors at the end of the 18th century, and its personnel received insufficient training (particularly in the Western Atlantic, priority being given to the continuing wars with France for control of Europe). The longer decks of the multi-masted vessels also had the advantage of allowing more guns to be carried.

Classification
Originally a sloop-of-war was smaller than a sailing frigate and was (by virtue of having too few guns) outside the rating system. In general, a sloop-of-war would be under the command of a master and commander rather than a post captain, although in day-to-day use at sea the commanding officer of any naval vessels would be addressed as "captain".

A ship sloop was generally the equivalent of the smaller corvette of the French Navy (although the French term also covered ships up to 24 guns, which were classed as post ships within the sixth rate of the British Navy). The name corvette was subsequently also applied to British vessels, but not until the 1830s.

American usage, while similar to British terminology into the beginning of the 19th century, gradually diverged. By about 1825 the United States Navy used "sloop-of-war" to designate a flush-deck ship-rigged warship with all armament on the gun deck; these could be rated as high as 26 guns and thus overlapped "third-class frigates," the equivalent of British post-ships. The Americans also occasionally used the French term corvette.

History

In the Royal Navy, the sloop evolved into an unrated vessel with a single gun deck and three masts, two square rigged and the aft-most fore-and-aft rigged (corvettes had three masts, all of which were square-rigged). Steam sloops had a transverse division of their lateral coal bunkers in order that the lower division could be emptied first, to maintain a level of protection afforded by the coal in the upper bunker division along the waterline.

During the War of 1812 sloops of war in the service of the United States Navy performed well against their Royal Navy equivalents. The American ships had the advantage of being ship-rigged rather than brig-rigged, a distinction that increased their manoeuvrability. They were also larger and better armed. Cruizer-class brig-sloops in particular were vulnerable in one-on-one engagements with American sloops-of-war.

Decline 
In the second half of the 19th century, successive generations of naval guns became larger and with the advent of steam-powered sloops, both paddle and screw, by the 1880s even the most powerful warships had fewer than a dozen large calibre guns, and were therefore technically sloops. Since the rating system was no longer a reliable indicator of a ship's combat power, it was abolished together and with it the classifications of sloops, corvettes and frigates. Instead a classification based on the intended role of the ship became common, such as cruiser and battleship.

Revival
During the First World War, the sloop rating was revived by the British Royal Navy for small warships not intended for fleet deployments.

The Royal Navy continued to build vessels rated as sloops during the interwar years. These sloops were small warships intended for colonial "gunboat diplomacy" deployments, surveying duties, and acting during wartime as convoy escorts. The Royal Navy officially dropped the term "sloop" in 1937, although the term remained in widespread and general use.

World War II

However, the warship-standards construction and sophisticated armaments of the sloop of that time did not lend themselves to mass production, and the sloop was supplanted by the corvette, and later the frigate, as the primary escort vessel of the Royal Navy. In 1948 the Royal Navy reclassified its remaining sloops and corvettes as frigates, even though the term sloop had been officially defunct for nine years.

2010s
The Royal Navy has proposed a concept, known as the "Future Black Swan-class Sloop-of-war", as an alternative to the Global Corvette of the Global Combat Ship programme.

Notable sloops
This was not a purpose-built naval sloop, but was a former merchant collier purchased by the Royal Navy and adapted for exploration purposes. Cook called Resolution "the ship of my choice", and "the fittest for service of any I have seen".
 , a sloop of the Continental Navy which served on diplomatic missions to France. Independence was the first ship acquired by the Continental Congress for use during the American Revolutionary War. She captured two British prizes during her cruises to Europe.
 In 1780, a  sloop bearing 16 six-pounders and a crew of 99 seamen delivered Major John Andre to his meeting with General Benedict Arnold, near Haverstraw, New York, to finalise plans for Arnold's surrender of West Point to the British. After Andre's capture and the unmasking of the plot, Arnold fled to British lines, borne down the Hudson River aboard Vulture.
 , a Cherokee-class brig-sloop re-rigged as a three-masted barque, is famous as the ship Charles Darwin sailed around the world in between 1831 and 1836.
 In 1804 Commodore Sir Samuel Hood, commissioned Diamond Rock, a small island south of Fort-de-France in Martinique, as HM Sloop-of-War Fort Diamond, following his establishment of a fortified garrison on the rock.

 In 1805,  (a Bermuda sloop) brought back news of the British victory at the Battle of Trafalgar.
 In 1800 and 1801 Lord Cochrane commanded , a brig-sloop of 14 guns, through a series of famous exploits in the Mediterranean. Speedy served as the inspiration for the fictional Jack Aubrey's first command, Sophie.
 , a United States Navy sloop-of-war which was captured by the British in Canadian waters. Later she was liberated by the U.S. Navy at the Battle of Lake Champlain.

 In 1813,  was dispatched to Fort Astoria at the mouth of the Columbia River during the War of 1812 to seize the post, which as it turned out had already been sold to the North-West Company; the fort was renamed by the ship's Captain Black as Fort George.
 , a U.S. Navy sloop which served with distinction during the War of 1812. She is responsible for sinking or capturing at least four British warships and capturing several other merchant vessels. This within months of her commissioning and before her own sinking during a Caribbean storm in October 1814.
 In 1826, acting as a warship of the Navy of the 1st Hellenic Republic under the command of Capt Frank Abney Hastings, was the first steam warship to see action. At the time the European armadas had no steam-warships.
 , a U.S. Navy sloop-of-war which served during the Mexican–American War in the California Campaign. She participated in combat during the Second Opium War, specifically the Battle of the Pearl River Forts. Later she served in the American Civil War, at the Battle of Forts Jackson and St. Philip.
 In 1843, flagship of Commodore Edwin Moore, and vessel of the Second Texas Navy, and was a participant in the naval Battle of Campeche, which is the only historical example of a sail navy having defeated a steam navy.
 , an 1854 sloop which is currently a museum ship. It was the last all-sail warship designed and built by the U.S. Navy.
 , an 1861 steam sloop-of-war best known for defeating the Confederate commerce raider  in a duel off the coast of Cherbourg, France in June 1864.
 , a 1938 sloop which was the first ship ever to be sunk by a guided missile, an event which occurred on 27 August 1943, when it was hit by a Henschel Hs 293 glide bomb launched from a Dornier Do 217.
 On 4  March 1942 HMAS Yarra sunk with the loss of 147 of 160 hands, while defending three ships under her protection from three Japanese cruisers and four destroyers. The actions of her crew are considered some of the bravest in the history of the Royal Australian Navy.
 , commanded by Captain Frederic John Walker, participated in the sinking of 14 U-boats between 1943 and 1944 as part of the 2nd Escort Group.
 In 1949, a Black Swan-class sloop of the Royal Navy became involved in an international incident when she became trapped in the Yangtze River by Communist Chinese shore batteries. She made a famous escape on 30 July 1949, later turned into a feature film Yangtse Incident: The Story of HMS Amethyst.

See also
List of corvette and sloop classes of the Royal Navy
List of sloops of war of the United States Navy

Rating system of the Royal Navy
List of frigates of the Second World War

References

Notes

Bibliography 
 Rodger, N.A.M. The Command of the Ocean, a Naval History of Britain 1649–1815, London (2004). 
 Bennett, G. The Battle of Trafalgar, Barnsley (2004). 
 Lavery, Brian Nelson's Navy: Ships, Men and Organization, 1793–1815 Conway Maritime Press Ltd (31 Mar 1999). 
 Winfield, Rif.
 British Warships in the Age of Sail: 1603–1714, Barnsley (2009). 
 British Warships in the Age of Sail: 1714–1792, Barnsley (2007). 
 British Warships in the Age of Sail: 1793–1817, (2nd edition) Barnsley (2008). .
 British Warships in the Age of Sail: 1817–1863, Barnsley (2014).

External links 
 Royal Navy Sloops from battleships-cruisers.co.uk – history and pictures from 1873 to 1943.
 Michael Phillips' Ships of the Old Navy 

 

Naval sailing ship types
Age of Sail naval ships